Kyara Linskens (born 13 November 1996) is a Belgian basketball player for Lattes-Montpellier and the Belgian national team.

She participated at the EuroBasket Women 2017.

References

External links
 
 Kyara Linskens at Eurobasket.com
 
 
 

1996 births
Living people
Belgian women's basketball players
Olympic basketball players of Belgium
Basketball players at the 2020 Summer Olympics
Belgian expatriate basketball people in Poland
Belgian expatriate basketball people in France
Centers (basketball)
Sportspeople from Bruges
Belgian expatriate basketball people in Russia
Belgian expatriate basketball people in the Czech Republic
Belgian expatriate basketball people in Italy